Haslet is a city in mostly Tarrant County and partly in Denton County within the Dallas–Fort Worth metroplex in the U.S. state of Texas, and is located 15 miles north of downtown Fort Worth and 20 miles south of Denton. Haslet borders Interstate 35W, U.S. Highway 287, and Alliance Airport.

History 

According to the Handbook of Texas, the area was settled around 1880, but likely no distinct community formed until 1883, when the tracks of the Gulf, Colorado and Santa Fe Railway were extended through the area. Haslett, Michigan, was the hometown of the railroad's contractor. A post office opened in 1887; by 1896, the one-teacher school had 21 students. Haslet's population was 67 in 1903 and 50 in 1915. During the 1920s, Haslet had three grocery stores, a hardware store, a dry goods store, and a cotton gin.

Geography

Haslet is located at  (32.959733, –97.340028).

Haslet is 702 ft. above sea level.

Climate

The climate in this area is characterized by hot, humid summers and generally mild to cool winters.  According to the Köppen climate classification, Haslet has a humid subtropical climate, Cfa on climate maps.

Demographics

2020 census

As of the 2020 United States census, there were 1,952 people, 835 households, and 730 families residing in the city.

2010 census
As of the census of 2010,  1,517 people, 533 households, and 454 families resided in the town. The population density was 151.2 people per square mile (58.4/km). The 533 housing units averaged 53.6 per square mile (20.7/km). The racial makeup of the city was 84.7% White, 0.5% Native American, 1.6% Asian, 2.8% from other races, and 1.9% from two or more races. Hispanics or Latinos of any race were 8.5% of the population. Males made up 51.3% of the population and females, 48.7%.

Of the 533 households, 40% had children under the age of 18 living with them, 75.8% were married couples living together, 4.9% had a single householder with no spouse present, and 14.8% were not families.  The average household size was 2.85 and the average family size was 3.1. The median age was 43.1 years.

According to Applied Geographic Solutions in 2012, the population had grown to 1,593 and total dwellings had increased to 566. About 45.4% of each household had an income of $100,000 or more with 71% making $60,000 or more. The median household income was $90,356. About 36.26% of the population had a bachelor's degree or higher; 93% had at least a high school education. Home values averaged $249,200. Owner-occupied housing units were 93.1%.

In 2010, the Gadberry Group named Haslet as one of the top-10 most notable areas in the country for growth.

Economic growth
Considered a major intermodal hub, Haslet has a transportation and distribution network via major highways, and nearby Alliance Airport. Dallas Fort Worth International Airport is 30 minutes away.

Haslet's primary trade area was 605,917 in 2015 and is expected to grow to 675,018 by 2019.  With a build-out of only 20% of available sites, Haslet is positioning itself to attract new corporations and businesses. Haslet offers a property tax rate of 33 cents per $100.

References

External links
 City of Haslet official website

Dallas–Fort Worth metroplex
Cities in Denton County, Texas
Cities in Tarrant County, Texas
Cities in Texas